Kang Han-byeol (born June 3, 2002) is a South Korean former child actor and singer. He began his career as a child actor in 2008, and was given roles in television dramas such as the KBS2 adaptation to Boys Over Flowers (2009) The King 2 Hearts (2012) and Hur Jun, the Original Story (2013). Inactive from 2015, he returned to the small screen in 2022 as an adult contestant on the ninth season of I Can See Your Voice.

Filmography

Television series

Film

Variety show

Music video

References

External links 
 
 

2002 births
Living people
South Korean male child actors
South Korean male television actors
South Korean male film actors
People from Anyang, Gyeonggi